Henry Edgarton Allen (14 December 1864 – 28 December 1924) was a Canadian politician and merchant. He was elected in 1908 to the House of Commons of Canada as a member of the Liberal Party representing the riding of Shefford.

References 
 

1864 births
Anglophone Quebec people
Liberal Party of Canada MPs
Members of the House of Commons of Canada from Quebec
People from Montérégie
1924 deaths
Place of death missing